Mustafa Abdülhalik Renda (29 November 1881 – 1 October 1957) was a Turkish civil servant and politician of Tosk Albanian descent. He is infamously known for Armenian genocide.

Biography 
Renda was born in Yanya, in the Janina Vilayet of the Ottoman Empire. Renda was of Albanian origin. From 1902 to 1918, he served in several towns and cities of the Ottoman Empire as district governor and province governor. In 1918, he was exiled for six months to Malta. Following his return, he was appointed undersecretary in the Ministry of Economy and then in the Ministry of Interior. He became Governor of Konya, before he was appointed the first Governor of İzmir after the Turkish forces re-captured the city from withdrawing Greek troops. During Renda's tenure as İzmir governor, politician Rıza Nur accused him on grounds of compatriot solidarity of encouraging Albanians (refugees and immigrants) to resettle from other Anatolian regions to İzmir, claims that Renda denied.   
 
From 1923 on, he was Deputy of Sivas for five consecutive terms. Mustafa Abdülhalik served as Minister of Finance and Minister of Defence in several cabinets from 1923 to 1935, and later from 1946 to 1948. After the Surname Law of 1934, which required all Turkish citizens to adopt a surname, he took on the surname "Renda". He was elected Speaker of the Grand National Assembly of Turkey on 1 March 1935, and served until 5 August 1946. During the early one-party period he emphasized on the need to Turkify the Kurds in the eastern provinces of Turkey. He was acting President of Turkey for one day after Atatürk's death in November 1938.

Abdülhalik Renda died of a heart attack on 1 October 1957 in Erenköy, Istanbul. He was laid to rest at the Cebeci Asri Cemetery in Ankara.

Armenian genocide
During the Armenian genocide Abdülhalik Renda was responsible for the deportations and murder of the Armenians of Bitlis Vilayet. He also organized the defense in the western mountain range against the Russian offensive in 1914, but to no avail, the Russians captured Saray as well as Başkale. In 1916, Renda became governor of Aleppo where he was instrumental in the deportations of Armenians to their deaths in Der Zor. Rossler, the German consul on Aleppo, was quoted as saying that Renda was "working with great energy for the destruction of Armenians". General Vehip Pasha, commander of the Third Army, mentioned that Renda in his testimony to the Mazhar Commission, claimed that he burned thousands of people alive in the province of Mush.

References

External links 
 Biyografi.info - Biography of Mustafa Abdülhalik Renda 

1881 births
1957 deaths
20th-century presidents of Turkey
Albanians from the Ottoman Empire
Politicians from Ioannina
People from Janina vilayet
Republican People's Party (Turkey) politicians
Ministers of Finance of Turkey
Ministers of National Defence of Turkey
Speakers of the Parliament of Turkey
Deputies of Çankırı
Governors (Turkey)
Civil servants from the Ottoman Empire
Turkish civil servants
Malta exiles
Armenian genocide perpetrators
Burials at Cebeci Asri Cemetery
Members of the 1st government of Turkey
Members of the 2nd government of Turkey
Members of the 3rd government of Turkey
Members of the 4th government of Turkey
Members of the 5th government of Turkey
Members of the 6th government of Turkey
Members of the 7th government of Turkey
Ottoman governors of Aleppo
Members of the 2nd Parliament of Turkey
Turkish nationalists
Acting presidents of Turkey